Hannoversche Allgemeine Zeitung (abbreviated HAZ) is a German newspaper with a circulation of 158,000 (as of 2009) and a widespread resonance all over Germany. It is distributed in Hanover and in all Lower Saxony.

History and profile
Hannoversche Zeitung was founded in 1851. Ulrich Neufert leads the HAZ as chief journalist.

References

 Ulrich Pätzold/Horst Röper: Medienatlas Niedersachsen-Bremen 2000. Medienkonzentration – Meinungsmacht – Interessenverflechtung. Verlag Buchdruckwerkstätten Hannover GmbH. Hannover 2000. 
 Jörg Aufermann/Victor Lis/Volkhard Schuster: Zeitungen in Niedersachsen und Bremen. Handbuch 2000. Verband Nordwestdeutscher Zeitungsverleger/Zeitungsverlegerverband Bremen. Hannover/Bremen 2000. .

External links
 
  

1949 establishments in West Germany
German-language newspapers
Mass media in Hanover
Newspapers published in Germany
Newspapers established in 1949